Euonymus glandulosus is a species of plant in the family Celastraceae. It is a tree found in Borneo and the Philippines.

References

glandulosus
Conservation dependent plants
Trees of Borneo
Trees of the Philippines
Taxonomy articles created by Polbot